Late Bloomers is a 2023 American coming-of-age drama. It marks the feature length debut for director Lisa Steen, was written by Anna Greenfield, and stars Karen Gillan and Margaret Sophie Stein. It was filmed in New York and produced by We’re Doin’ Great and Park Pictures. The film was shown at the SXSW Festival where it had its world premiere on March 10, 2023.

Synopsis
Louise is an aimless twenty-something, a musician who is recently single, when she drunkenly breaks her hip. The subsequent physical therapy sees her associate with people twice her age when she meets a Polish lady who speaks no English.

Cast
 Karen Gillan as Louise
 Margaret Sophie Stein as Antonina
 Jermaine Fowler  
 Kevin Nealon
 Talia Balsam
 Michelle Twarowska

Production
Written by Anna Greenfield who based a lot of the script on personal experiences, Greenfield and director Lisa Steen have known each other since college. In July 2022 Karen Gillan, Margaret Sophie Stein and Jermaine Fowler were revealed to have joined the cast which had wrapped principal photography in Brooklyn, New York. The film was produced by We’re Doin’ Great and Park Pictures.

Release
The film had its world premiere at the South by Southwest Festival in Austin, Texas on March 10, 2023.

Reception
Damon Wise in Deadline Hollywood described it as “an intimate, defiantly female-fronted indie, showcasing an engaging and refreshingly vanity-free performance from Karen Gillan”. Jason Bailey for The Playlist felt it was predictable in places and had familiar tropes but described it as “about as well-acted and enjoyable a version of this particular thing as you’re likely to find.” Samantha Bergeson for IndieWire gave the film a D, writing that “the film doesn’t open up in time to blossom into something great” and its “whispers of emotional depth…come too little and too late.”

References

External links

2023 films
2023 drama films
2023 directorial debut films
Films set in Brooklyn
American coming-of-age films
2020s coming-of-age films
2020s coming-of-age comedy-drama films